The Chakma Autonomous District Council (CADC) is an autonomous council for the Chakma people living in the south-western part of Mizoram, India. It covers the Tuichawng (Chawngte) subdivision of Lawngtlai district. Its headquarters is at Kamalanagar. The Chakma people has been demanding to change the status of the Chakma Autonomous District Council into a Union territory under the name Chakmaland.

The Chakma Autonomous District Council was formed under the Sixth schedule of the Constitution of India on 29 April 1972. The Council is the replication of the state assembly and exercises executive power over specially allotted departments. It is one of the three Autonomous District Councils of Mizoram state in North-East India. It is an autonomous council for ethnic Chakma people living in South-Western Mizoram bordering Bangladesh and Myanmar. There is also a growing demand for 'Chakmaland' union territory.

History

In 1954 the Central and Assam governments established a regional council, the Pawi Lakher Regional Council (PLRC), for the Lakhers (aka Mara) and the Pawis (aka Lai), in which a large number of Chakmas also resided. However, the PLRC could not function properly right from its inception as there was no common communication language among the three tribal communities to understand each other. The first meeting was held without understanding each other’s language. Consequently, in 1958 the Maras boycotted PLRC meetings. In 1972, to resolve the issue the PLRC was divided into three regional councils and upgraded to 3 district councils for Maras, Lais and Chakmas.

Geography
The surface area of the Chakma Autonomous District Council is 686.25 sq.km. The headquarters of Chakma Autonomous District Council is Kamalanagar, which means the land of oranges in Chakma language. It is parted into Kamalanagar -1,2,3 & 4. There is only one college in CADC called as Kamalanagar College located at Kamalanagar-2 (Randokpur). Kamalanagar is located on the north-eastern corner of C.A.D.C and on the bank of Tuichawng river. On the east of Kamalanagar town i.e. on the other bank of Toizong (Tuichawng) there stands two Mizo villages known as Chawngte P and Chawngte L. On the eastern bank of Toizong is divided by the rivulet, Chawngte L (Ponsury as called by the Chakmas) the northern bank falling under Lunglei General district and the southern bank Chawngte P, under Lai autonomous District Council.

Economy
Majority of the Chakmas in Mizoram take up farming as their occupation. This occupation is inherited from their ancestors. They mainly grow rice, vegetables and fruits, etc. Rice is considered as the staple food of the Chakmas living in Chakma Autonomous District Council.

Demographics
The total Chakma population of Mizoram is estimated to be more than 100,000 (as per the 2011 census - 96,972). The population of Chakma Autonomous District Council are primarily Chakmas who are a designated Schedule Tribe. The total population of CADC is 45,307 as per 2011 census out of which 70% of it is dependent on agriculture. The population grew from 34,528 in 2001 to 40,265 (as of 2008). The majority of the people of Chakma Autonomous District Council follow Theravada Buddhism.

Structure
Chakma Autonomous District Council has a total of 24 Members of District Council (MDC), out of which 20 MDCs are elected and 4 MDCs are nominated. The council is led by a Chief Executive Member (CEM) and Executive Members (EMs). The present CEM is Buddha Lila Chakma.

Departments
It has a total of 27 No. of departments and they are as follows:
 Legislative Department
 Judicial Department
 Finance Department
 General Administration Department
 Agriculture Department
 Horticulture Department
 Fishery Department
 Public Health Engineering Department
 Industry Department
 Sericulture Department
 AH & Vety Department
 Art & Culture Department
 Social Welfare Department
 Soil & Water Conservation Department
 Local Administrative Department
 Environment & Forest Department
 Road Transport Department
 Sport & Youth Department
 Co-operative Department
 Public Works Department
 Education Department
 Rural Development Department
 Water ways Department
 Information & Public Relation Department
 District School Education Board
 Land Revenue & Settlement
 Planning & Development Department

Number of village councils
CADC have 73 villages.

 Adhubangasora
 Ajasora - I
 Ajasora - II
 Ajasora - III
 Baganpara
 Borunasury
 Bajeisora
 Bandukbanga
 Betbonia
 Bilosora
 Boraguisury
 Borakabakhali
 Borapansury - I
 Borapansury - II
 Borkolok
 Boroituli
 Bottuli
 Charluitlang
 Chhotaguisury - I
 Chhotaguisury - II
 Chhotapansury
 Devasora 'N'
 Devasora 'S'
 Dursora
 Fulsora
 Fultuli
 Futsury
 Geraguluksora
 Gerasury
 Gobasury
 Golasury
 Gulsingbapsora
 Jamersury
 Jaruldobasora
 Jarulsury
 Kamalanagar - I
 Kamalanagar - II
 Kamalanagar - III
 Kamalanagar - IV
 Kamtuli
 Kukurduleya
 Kurbalavasora
 Lokhisury
 Longpuighat
 Ludisora
 Mandirasora
 Maniabapsora - I
 Maniabapsora - II
 Montola
 Nadarasora
 Nalbania
 New Chhippui
 New Jagnasury - I
 New Jagnasury - II
 Old Bajeisora
 Parva - I
 Parva - II
 Parva - III
 Rajmandal
 Rengashya
 Silosora
 Silsury
 Simeisury
 Siminesora
 Udalthanasora - I
 Udalthanasora - II
 Ugalsury
 Ugudasory 'S'
 UgudasurY 'N'
 Ulusury
 Vaseitlang - I
 Vaseitlang - II
 W.Saizawh

Chief executives
The Chief Executive Member exercises all its executive powers in the name of the executive committee of the District Council. The chief executive chairs meetings of the executive committee of the Chakma Autonomous District Council.

Politics
Of the 20 elected District Council Members- MNF (18), BJP (2).

Of the 516 village council seats in Chakma Autonomous District Council, the Mizo National Front has 371 seats, Bharatiya Janata Party has 115 seats, Indian National Congress has 2 seats and independent candidates have 27 seats. The MNF is in majority in 65 village Councils while the BJP is in majority in 16 village Council.In the remaining 4 Village Council no party has absolute majority.

See also

 Buddha Dhan Chakma
 Nirupam Chakma
 Nihar Kanti Chakma
 Rasik Mohan Chakma
 Kristo Mohan Chakma
 Lai Autonomous District Council
 Mara Autonomous District Council
 North Eastern Council
 Hill tribes of Northeast India

References

External links
Chakma Autonomous District Council
1. https://theprint.in/india/mizoram-new-chief-executive-member-sworn-in-for-chakma-autonomous-district-council/990751/?amp

2. https://www.northeasttoday.in/2022/06/09/mizoram-chakma-autonomous-district-council-cadc-gets-new-chief-executive-member/

Autonomous district councils of India
Chakma
1972 establishments in Mizoram